The NBA G League Rookie of the Year is an annual NBA G League (formerly known as the NBA Development League) award given since the league's inaugural season to the top rookie of the regular season. The league's head coaches determine the award by voting and it is usually presented to the honoree during the playoffs.

Fred House was the inaugural winner while playing for the North Charleston Lowgators. Three international players have won the award: Edwin Ubiles of Puerto Rico in 2012, Abdel Nader of Egypt in 2017, and Ángel Delgado of the Dominican Republic in 2019. By position, guards have won 10 times and forwards nine times.

Winners

See also
NBA Rookie of the Year Award

References

External links
D-League Rookie of the Year Award Winners at basketball-reference.com.com

National Basketball Association lists
Rookie Of The Year
Awards established in 2002
2002 establishments in the United States
Rookie player awards